Jérémie Galland (born 8 April 1983) is a French former professional road cyclist, who competed as a professional between 2007 and 2013.

Major results

2008
 3rd Route Adélie
 4th Grand Prix de Fourmies
2009
 6th Le Samyn
 7th Paris–Troyes
 1st Overall Grand Prix de Plumelec-Morbihan
 6th Boucles de l'Aulne
 3rd Overall Ronde de l'Oise
 9th Overall Boucles de la Mayenne
 4th Tour de la Somme
2010
 6th Boucles de l'Aulne
 1st Overall Boucles de la Mayenne
 2nd Polynormande
 4th Overall Paris–Corrèze
 1st Stage 1 Tour du Limousin
2011
 9th Overall Tour de Picardie
 3rd Grand Prix de Plumelec-Morbihan
 6th Overall Tour de Luxembourg
2013
 4th Grand Prix Pino Cerami

References

External links

Jérémie Gallard profile at Saur-Sojasun

1983 births
Living people
French male cyclists
Sportspeople from Villeneuve-Saint-Georges
Cyclists from Île-de-France